Finnish national road 4 ( or ;  or ; also known as Lahti Highway in the Helsinki Metropolitan Area) is a highway in Finland. It is the main route from Helsinki to Northern Finland and a major road link in the country. It runs from Erottaja in Helsinki to Sami Bridge in Utsjoki. The road is also part of the European route E75 and it is a part of TERN; the section between Oulu and Kemi is part of the European route E8.

Overview
The route of the road is Helsinki – Lahti – Heinola – Jyväskylä – Äänekoski – Oulu – Kemi – Rovaniemi – Sodankylä – Ivalo – Inari – Utsjoki.

At Heinola, another highway called Finnish national road 5 branches off from the road, which passes through Mikkeli, Kuopio, Kajaani and Kuusamo, and finally coming together again with Highway 4 at Sodankylä.

The original highway 4 ran from Helsinki to Petsamo before World War II. Since the end of the war, the road has been rerouted to Ivalo and Karigasniemi on the Norwegian border. Other route modifications have been made through the years.

Images

See also 
 Finnish national road 58
 Highways in Finland
 Åland Islands Highway 4

External links

Nelostieyhdistys 
HS article International Edition

Roads in Finland
Roads within the Arctic Circle
Transport in Jyväskylä